Erlend Holm (born 17 May 1983 in Ålesund) is a Norwegian teacher and former part-time football defender who played for Aalesund until 2008, when he after the season was released. Since then, he decided to retire from football at 25 years old, despite receiving offers from other clubs, to concentrate on his studies.

He has also played for the Norwegian under-21 national team.

References

1983 births
Living people
Norwegian footballers
Aalesunds FK players
Eliteserien players
Association football defenders
Sportspeople from Ålesund